Calvin Li or Li Zonghan (born 7 November 1976) is a Chinese actor of Manchu ethnicity. Li is noted for his roles as Wu Yong and Yang Zhenjiang in the television series and film All Men Are Brothers and Hushed Roar respectively.

Life

Early life
Li was born and raised in Wuhan, Hubei, his mother is a Beijing Opera actress. Li graduated from Central Academy of Drama, majoring in acting.  He is also a trained dancer.  He is a member of the Manchu's Aisin Gioro clan.

Acting career
Li began his career as an advertising model after graduation.

Li made his acting debut in the historical television series Zhuge Liang, playing Zhuge Zhan, the son of Zhuge Liang.

In 2010, Li played the character Wisdom and Monk Jian Hui in John Woo's Reign of Assassins, a wuxia film starring Michelle Yeoh, Jung Woo-sung, Wang Xueqi, Barbie Shu, Shawn Yue, and Kelly Lin. That same year, he also participated in Alan Mak and Felix Chong's The Lost Bladesman as Qin Qi, a subordinate of Cao Cao's general Xiahou Dun.

In 2011, Li co-starred with Huo Siyan and Charlie Young in the suspense film Sleepwalker as Eric, he received positive reviews. At the same year, Li starred as Wu Yong in the historical television series All Men Are Brothers, adapted from Shi Nai'an's classical novel Water Margin, the series was one of the most watched ones in mainland China in that year.

In 2012, Li was nomination for the Newly Improved Actor Award at the Chinese American Film Festival for his performance as Yang Zhenjiang in Hushed Roar.

Works

Film

Television

Drama

Awards

References

External links

 

 

1976 births
Male actors from Wuhan
Living people
Central Academy of Drama alumni
Chinese male film actors
Chinese male television actors
21st-century Chinese male actors
Manchu male actors